Jamie Paul Holmes (born 13 October 1992) is a New Zealand-born Irish cricketer. He made his Twenty20 cricket debut for Northern Knights in the 2017 Inter-Provincial Trophy on 16 June 2017.

References

External links
 
 

1992 births
Living people
Irish cricketers
Northern Knights cricketers